The athlete quota for archery is 64 athletes, 32 men and 32 women. There is a maximum of six athletes per National Olympic Committee, three per gender. NOC's with three athletes of the same gender automatically qualify for the team competition. There were 2 qualification tournaments for each gender to qualify athletes.

Qualification summary

Men

 Excluding Mexico (who finished third at this tournament), who already have qualified. 
 Excluding teams that qualified from the above criteria. 
 A nation that qualified two or one athlete can only enter one and two athletes respectively at this tournament. A country that did not qualify an athlete may enter 3.

Women

 Excluding Mexico (who finished first at this tournament), who already have qualified. 
 Excluding teams that qualified from the above criteria. 
 A nation that qualified two or one athlete can only enter one and two athletes respectively at this tournament. A country that did not qualify an athlete may enter 3.

References 

Qualification for the 2011 Pan American Games
Archery at the 2011 Pan American Games